James Boyle (born 11 July 1866) was a Scottish footballer who played as a centre-half and goalkeeper in the Football League for Woolwich Arsenal. He had previously played for Celtic and Clyde, and went on to play for Dartford.

References

External links
Arsenal profile

1866 births
Year of death missing
People from Springburn
Footballers from Glasgow
Scottish footballers
Association football defenders
Association football goalkeepers
Celtic F.C. players
Clyde F.C. players
Arsenal F.C. players
Dartford F.C. players
English Football League players